Scythris ugandica is a moth of the family Scythrididae. It was described by Bengt Å. Bengtsson in 2014. It is found in Uganda.

References

ugandica
Moths described in 2014